Jabukovac may refer to:

 Jabukovac, Negotin, a village in eastern Serbia
 Jabukovac, Aleksinac, a village in central Serbia
 Jabukovac, Croatia, a village near Petrinja, Croatia